Mattias Andersson (born 9 May 1973 in Åtvidaberg) is a Swedish race car driver and Eurosport commentator, who currently resides in Linköping, Sweden. He started his career in Scandinavian Formula Opel in 1991 and continued in Scandinavia until 1996, when he joined the Barber Dodge Pro Series. He moved to Indy Lights in 1998, where he drove a select few races, before moving on to the Swedish Touring Car Championship in a works Opel Vectra. In 2003, he drove a BMW 320i in the STCC for WestCoast Racing, before moving to Team Italienska Bil in an Alfa Romeo 156 in 2004. Since 2006, he has driven that car for his own team, MA:GP.

References

External links

1973 births
Living people
Swedish racing drivers
Swedish Touring Car Championship drivers
Indy Lights drivers
Atlantic Championship drivers
EFDA Nations Cup drivers
Barber Pro Series drivers
European Touring Car Championship drivers
European Touring Car Cup drivers
European Rallycross Championship drivers